Bioscope may refer to:

 An early generic name for a movie camera
 Various specific models of movie camera and movie projector
 The Urban Bioscope or Warwick Bioscope, camera and projector
 Emil and Max Skladanowsky's Bioscop
 A bioscope show, a travelling movie theatre
 Bioscope (Live TV), a Bangladeshi video streaming platform
 An obsolete regional term for a movie theatre
 Bioscope (2008 film), an Indian film
 Bioscope (2015 film), an Indian drama film
 Le Bioscope, a former theme park in France
 BioScope: South Asian Screen Studies